Yes Comedy (styled as yes Comedy and formerly called yes stars Comedy) is an Israeli television channel carried by the Israeli satellite television provider – yes, which broadcasts American and British TV shows of the sitcom, dramedy and comedy genres. The channel aired on December 14, 2008 on channel 14 – as part of the latest television shows' channels re-brand by yes. The channel is a split of the former yes stars 1 to the current yes Drama and yes Comedy. The channel used to air the shows' new episodes on weeknights (Sundays – Thursdays), and its re-runs on weekdays and weekends (Fridays – Saturdays). On January 16, 2012, the channel moved from channel 14 to channel 15.

On December 14, 2010, 2 years the channel is on air, it started airing 24/7, and carried the slogan – Always Funny.

yes Comedy schedule is being simulcasted in High Definition on yes Comedy HD on channel 15.

Schedule 
Starting March 6, 2010, yes Comedy airs new episodes on weekends. There are currently airing the following shows:

Fridays 
 Futurama (Season 8)
 The Simpsons (Season 21)
 It's Always Sunny in Philadelphia (Season 6)

Saturdays 
 Raising Hope (Season 3)
 How I Met Your Mother (Season 9)
 Two and a Half Men (Season 10)
 Modern Family (Season 4)
 Saturday Night Live (Season 37)
 The Big Bang Theory (Season 6)
 New Girl (Season 2)
 Family Guy (Season 10)

In addition, on the weeknights there are syndicated shows alongside The Tonight Show with Jay Leno.

Starting March 13, 2011, yes airs on the weeknights 2 episodes each night of Friends in High Definition re-master. In June 2011 yes aired 2 episodes each night of Married... with Children. From December 18, 2011, yes aired 2 episodes each weeknights of Seinfeld. Also airing 2 weekly episodes of Arrested Development.

History of the channel 
On December 14, 2008, as part of another re-brand of the channels, yes stars 1 was replaced with yes stars Comedy. On August 20, 2010, the word stars was removed from the channel name. On January 16, 2012, the channel moved from channel 14 to channel 15, and the logo has been changed.

Picture formats 

yes Comedy airs shows in 4 formats:
 Normal (4:3)
 Letterboxed (4:3)
 Pan & Scan (4:3)
 Widescreen (16:9)

In order to watch widescreen (16:9) shows on a 4:3 TV, there are 3 options to see the picture: 
 4:3 Letterbox (Widescreen with black bars – Original Aspect Ratio)
 16:9 (Anamorphic Widescreen)
 4:3 (Pan & scan)

Choosing the format of the picture is in the digital set-top box setup. The setup does not affect shows which are not broadcast in Widescreen. yes Comedy HD airs the shows in High Definition 1080i and in widescreen (16:9) at all times. Shows that are not shot in HD are upscaled to 1080i.

Shows broadcast on yes Comedy

References

External links

Television channels in Israel
Yes (Israel)